Vojvodina, officially the Autonomous Province of Vojvodina, is an autonomous province that occupies the northernmost part of Serbia. It lies within the Pannonian Basin, bordered to the south by the national capital Belgrade and the Sava and Danube Rivers. The administrative center, Novi Sad, is the second-largest city in Serbia.

The historic regions of Banat, Bačka, and Syrmia overlap the province. Modern Vojvodina is multi-ethnic and multi-cultural, with some 26 ethnic groups and six official languages. About two million people, nearly 27% of Serbia's population, live in the province.

Name
Vojvodina is also the Serbian word for voivodeship, a type of duchy overseen by a voivode. The Serbian Voivodeship, a precursor to modern Vojvodina, was an Austrian province from 1849 to 1860.

Its official name is the Autonomous Province of Vojvodina. Its name in the province's six official languages is:
 Croatian: Autonomna Pokrajina Vojvodina
 Serbian: Аутономна Покрајина Војводина / Autonomna Pokrajina Vojvodina
 Pannonian Rusyn: Автономна Покраїна Войводина (Avtonomna Pokrayina Voyvodina)
 Slovak: Autonómna pokrajina Vojvodina
 Romanian: Provincia Autonomă Voivodina
 Hungarian: Vajdaság Autonóm Tartomány

History

Pre-Roman times and Roman rule
In the Neolithic period, two important archaeological cultures flourished in this area: the Starčevo culture and the Vinča culture. Indo-European peoples first settled in the territory of present-day Vojvodina in 3200 BC. During the Eneolithic period, the Bronze Age and the Iron Age, several Indo-European archaeological cultures were centered in or around Vojvodina, including the Vučedol culture, the Vatin culture, and the Bosut culture, among others.

Before the Roman conquest in the 1st century BC, Indo-European peoples of Illyrian, Thracian and Celtic origin inhabited this area. The first states organized in this area were the Celtic State of the Scordisci (3rd century BC-1st century AD) with capital in Singidunum (Belgrade), and the Dacian Kingdom of Burebista (1st century BC).

During Roman rule, Sirmium (modern Sremska Mitrovica) was one of the four capital cities of the Roman Empire, and six Roman Emperors were born in this city or in its surroundings. The city was also the capital of several Roman administrative units, including Pannonia Inferior, Pannonia Secunda, the Diocese of Pannonia, and the Praetorian prefecture of Illyricum.

Roman rule lasted until the 5th century, after which the region came into the possession of various peoples and states. While Banat was a part of the Roman province of Dacia, Syrmia belonged to the Roman province of Pannonia. Bačka was not part of the Roman Empire and was populated and ruled by Sarmatian Iazyges.

Early Middle Ages and Slavic settlement
After the Romans were driven away from this region, various Indo-European and Turkic peoples and states ruled in the area. These peoples included Goths, Sarmatians, Huns, Gepids and Avars. For regional history, the largest in importance was a Gepid state, which had its capital in Sirmium. According to the 7th-century Miracles of Saint Demetrius, Avars gave the region of Syrmia to a Bulgar leader named Kuber circa 680. The Bulgars of Kuber moved south with Maurus to Macedonia where they co-operated with Tervel in the 8th century.

Slavs settled today's Vojvodina in the 6th and 7th centuries, before some of them crossed the rivers Sava and Danube and settled in the Balkans. Slavic tribes that lived in the territory of present-day Vojvodina included Abodrites, Severans, Braničevci and Timočani.

In the 9th century, after the fall of the Avar state, the first forms of Slavic statehood emerged in this area. The first Slavic states that ruled over this region included the Bulgarian Empire, Great Moravia and Ljudevit's Pannonian Duchy. During the Bulgarian administration (9th century), local Bulgarian dukes, Salan and Glad, ruled over the region. Salan's residence was Titel, while that of Glad was possibly in the rumoured rampart of Galad or perhaps in the Kladovo (Gladovo) in eastern Serbia. Glad's descendant was the duke Ahtum, another local ruler from the 11th century who opposed the establishment of Hungarian rule over the region.

In the village of Čelarevo archaeologists have also found traces of people who practised the Judaic religion. Bunardžić dated Avar-Bulgar graves excavated in Čelarevo, containing skulls with Mongolian features and Judaic symbols, to the late 8th and 9th centuries. Erdely and Vilkhnovich consider the graves to belong to the Kabars who eventually broke ties with the Khazar Empire between the 830s and 862. (Three other Khazar tribes joined the Magyars and took part in the Magyar conquest of the Carpathian basin including what is now Vojvodina in 895–907.)

Hungarian rule

Following territorial disputes with Byzantine and Bulgarian states, most of Vojvodina became part of the Kingdom of Hungary between the 10th and 12th century and remained under Hungarian administration until the 16th century (Following periods of Ottoman and Habsburg administrations, Hungarian political dominance over most of the region was established again in 1867 and over entire region in 1882, after abolition of the Habsburg Military Frontier).

The regional demographic balance started changing in the 11th century when Magyars began to replace the local Slavic population. But from the 14th century, the balance changed again in favour of the Slavs when Serbian refugees fleeing from territories conquered by the Ottoman army settled in the area. Most of the Hungarians left the region during the Ottoman conquest and early period of Ottoman administration, so the population of Vojvodina in Ottoman times was predominantly Serbs (who comprised an absolute majority of Vojvodina at the time), with significant presence of Muslims of various ethnic backgrounds.

Ottoman rule
After the defeat of the Kingdom of Hungary at Mohács by the Ottoman Empire, the region fell into a period of anarchy and civil wars. In 1526 Jovan Nenad, a leader of Serb mercenaries, established his rule in Bačka, northern Banat and a small part of Syrmia. He created an ephemeral independent state, with Subotica as its capital.

At the peak of his power, Jovan Nenad proclaimed himself Serbian Emperor in Subotica. Taking advantage of the extremely confused military and political situation, the Hungarian noblemen from the region joined forces against him and defeated the Serbian troops in the summer of 1527. Emperor Jovan Nenad was assassinated and his state collapsed. After the fall of emperor's state, the supreme military commander of Jovan Nenad's army, Radoslav Čelnik, established his own temporary state in the region of Syrmia, where he ruled as Ottoman vassal.

A few decades later, the whole region was added to the Ottoman Empire, which ruled over it until the end of the 17th and the first half of the 18th century, when it was incorporated into the Habsburg monarchy. The Treaty of Karlowitz of 1699, between Holy League and Ottoman Empire, marked the withdrawal of the Ottoman forces from Central Europe, and the supremacy of the Habsburg monarchy in that part of the continent. According to the treaty, the western part of Vojvodina passed to Habsburgs. The eastern part (eastern Syrmia and Province of Tamışvar) remained in Ottoman hands until Austrian conquest in 1716. This new border change was ratified by the Treaty of Passarowitz in 1718.

Habsburg rule

Hungarian Crown land (1699–1849)
During the Great Serb Migration, Serbs from Ottoman territories settled in the Habsburg monarchy at the end of the 17th century (in 1690). Most settled in what is now Hungary, with the lesser part settling in western Vojvodina. All Serbs in the Habsburg monarchy gained the status of a recognized nation with extensive rights, in exchange for providing a border militia (in the Military Frontier) that could be mobilized against invaders from the south (such as the Ottomans), as well as in case of civil unrest in the Habsburg Kingdom of Hungary. Wallachian Right became the point of reference in the 18th century for military settlement in lowland region. The Vlachs who settled there were actually mainly Serbs, although there were also and Romanians while Aromanians lived in the urban areas.

At the beginning of Habsburg rule, most of the region was integrated into the Military Frontier, while western parts of Bačka were put under civil administration within the County of Bač. Later, the civil administration was expanded to other (mostly northern) parts of the region, while southern parts remained under military administration. The eastern part of this area was held again by the Ottoman Empire between 1787 and 1788, during the Russo-Turkish War. In 1716, Vienna temporarily forbade settlement by Hungarians and Jews in the area, while large numbers of German speakers were settled in the region from Bavaria and southern areas, in order to repopulate it and develop agriculture. From 1782, Protestant Hungarians and ethnic Germans settled in larger numbers.

During the 1848–49 revolutions, Vojvodina was a site of a war between Serbs and Hungarians, due to the opposite national conceptions of these two peoples. At the May Assembly in Sremski Karlovci (13–15 May 1848), Serbs declared the constitution of the Serbian Voivodship (Serbian Duchy), a Serbian autonomous region within the Austrian Empire. The Serbian Voivodship consisted of Srem, Bačka, Banat, and Baranja.

The head of the metropolitanate of Sremski Karlovci, Josif Rajačić, was elected patriarch, while Stevan Šupljikac was chosen as first voivod (duke). The ethnic war erupted harshly in this area, with both sides committing terrible atrocities against the civilian populations.

Austrian Crown land (1849–1860)

Following the Habsburg-Russian and Serb victory over the Hungarians in 1849, a new administrative territory was created in the region in November 1849, in accordance with a decision made by the Austrian emperor. By this decision, the Serbian autonomous region created in 1848 was transformed into the new Austrian crown land known as Voivodeship of Serbia and Banat of Temeschwar. It consisted of Banat, Bačka and Srem, excluding the southern parts of these regions which were part of the Military Frontier.
An Austrian governor seated in Temeschwar ruled the area, while the title of Voivod belonged to the emperor himself. The full title of the emperor was "Grand Voivod of the Voivodship of Serbia" (German: Großwoiwode der Woiwodschaft Serbien). German and Serbian were the official languages of the crown land. In 1860, the new province was abolished and most of it (with exception of Syrmia) was again integrated into the Habsburg Kingdom of Hungary.

Hungarian rule

Hungarian Crown land (1860–1867)

Vojvodina remained Austrian Crown land until 1860, when Emperor Franz Joseph decided that it would be Hungarian Crown land again. After 1867, the Kingdom of Hungary became one of two self-governing parts of Austria-Hungary, and the territory was returned again to Hungarian administration.

Counties in the Kingdom of Hungary (1867–1920)

In 1867, a new county system was introduced. This territory was organized among Bács-Bodrog, Torontál and Temes counties. The era following the Austro-Hungarian Compromise of 1867 was a period of economic flourishing. The Kingdom of Hungary had the second-fastest growing economy in Europe between 1867 and 1913, but ethnic relations were strained. According to the 1910 census, the last census conducted in Austria-Hungary, the population of Vojvodina included 510,754 (33.8%) Serbs; 425,672 (28.1%) Hungarians; and 324,017 (21.4%) Germans.

Kingdom of Yugoslavia

At the end of World War I, the Austro-Hungarian Empire collapsed. On 29 October 1918, Syrmia became a part of the State of Slovenes, Croats and Serbs. On 31 October 1918, the Banat Republic was proclaimed in Timișoara. The government of Hungary recognized its independence, but it was short-lived.

On 25 November 1918, the Great People's Assembly of Serbs, Bunjevci and other Slavs in Banat, Bačka and Baranja in Novi Sad proclaimed the unification of Vojvodina (Banat, Bačka and Baranja) with the Kingdom of Serbia (The assembly numbered 757 deputies, of which 578 were Serbs, 84 Bunjevci, 62 Slovaks, 21 Rusyn, 6 Germans, 3 Šokci, 2 Croats and 1 Hungarian). One day before this, on 24 November, the Assembly of Syrmia also proclaimed the unification of Syrmia with Serbia. On 1 December 1918, Vojvodina (as part of the Kingdom of Serbia) officially became part of the Kingdom of Serbs, Croats and Slovenes.

Between 1929 and 1941, the region was part of the Danube Banovina, a province of the Kingdom of Yugoslavia. Its capital city was Novi Sad. Apart from the core territories of Vojvodina and Baranja, it included significant parts of Šumadija and Braničevo regions south of the Danube (but not the capital city of Belgrade).

World War II and immediate aftermath
Between 1941 and 1944, during World War II, Nazi Germany and its allies, Hungary and the Independent State of Croatia, occupied Vojvodina and divided it. Bačka and Baranja were annexed by Hungary and Syrmia was included in the Independent State of Croatia. A smaller Danube Banovina (including Banat, Šumadija, and Braničevo) was designated as part of the area governed by the Military Administration in Serbia. The administrative center of this smaller province was Smederevo. But, Banat was a separate autonomous region ruled by its ethnic German minority.

The occupying powers committed numerous crimes against the civilian population, especially against Serbs, Jews and Roma; the Jewish population of Vojvodina was almost completely killed or deported. In total, Axis occupational authorities killed about 50,000 citizens of Vojvodina (mostly Serbs, Jews and Roma) while more than 280,000 people were interned, arrested, violated or tortured. Such crimes in varying regions of Vojvodina were carried out by Nazi Germans, Ustaše and Hungarian Axis forces. Many historians and authors describe the Ustashe regime's mass killings as genocide of the Serbs, including Raphael Lemkin. In 1942, in the Novi Sad Raid, a military operation carried out by the Királyi Honvédség, the armed forces of Hungary, during World War II, after occupation and annexation of former Yugoslav territories. It resulted in the deaths of 3,000–4,000 civilians in the southern Bačka (Bácska) region. Under the Hungarian authority, 19,573 people were killed in Bačka, of which the majority of victims were of Serb, Jewish and Romani origin.

When Axis occupation ended in 1944, the region was temporarily placed under a military administration (1944–45) run by the new communist authorities. During and after the military administration, several thousands of citizens were killed. Victims were mostly ethnic Germans, but Hungarian and Serb populations were also killed. Both the war-time Axis occupational authorities and the post-war communist authorities ran concentration/prison camps in the territory of Vojvodina (see List of concentration and internment camps). While war-time prisoners in these camps were mostly Jews, Serbs and communists, post-war camps were formed for ethnic Germans (historically known as Danube Swabians).

Most Vojvodina ethnic Germans (about 200,000) fled the region in 1944, together with the defeated German army. Most of those who remained in the region (about 150,000) were sent to some of the villages cordoned off as prisons. It is estimated that some 48,447 Germans died in the camps from disease, hunger, malnutrition, mistreatment, and cold. Some 8,049 Germans were killed by partisans during military administration in Vojvodina after October 1944.

It has also been estimated that post-war communist authorities killed some 15,000–20,000 Hungarians and some 23,000–24,000 Serbs during Communist purges in Serbia in 1944–45. According to Professor Dragoljub Živković, some 47,000 ethnic Serbs were murdered in Vojvodina between 1941 and 1948. About half were killed by occupational Axis forces and the other half by the post-war Communist authorities.

The region was politically restored in 1944 (incorporating Syrmia, Banat, Bačka, and Baranja) and became an autonomous province of Serbia in 1945. Instead of the previous name (Danube Banovina), the region regained its historical name of Vojvodina, while its capital city remained Novi Sad. When the final borders of Vojvodina were defined, Baranja was assigned to Croatia, while the northern part of the Mačva region was assigned to Vojvodina.

Socialist Yugoslavia
For decades, the province enjoyed only a small level of autonomy within Serbia. Under the 1974 Yugoslav constitution, it gained extensive rights of self-rule, as both Kosovo and Vojvodina were given de facto veto power in the Serbian and Yugoslav parliaments. Changes to their status could not be made without the consent of the two Provincial Assemblies.

The 1974 Serbian constitution, adopted at the same time, reiterated that "the Socialist Republic of Serbia comprises the Socialist Autonomous Province of Vojvodina and the Socialist Autonomous Province of Kosovo, which originated in the common struggle of nations and nationalities of Yugoslavia in the National Liberation War (the Second World War) and socialist revolution".

In 1990s, during the war in Croatia in persecution of Croats in Serbia during Yugoslav Wars was organized and participated in the expulsion of the Croats in some places in Vojvodina. Based on an investigation by the Humanitarian Law Fund from Belgrade in the course of June, July, and August 1992, more than 10,000 Croats from Vojvodina exchanged their property for the property of Serbs from Croatia, and altogether about 20,000 Croats left Serbia. According to other estimations, the number of Croats which have left Serbia under political pressure of Milošević's regime might be between 20,000 and 40,000. According to Petar Kuntić of Democratic Alliance of Croats in Vojvodina, 50,000 Croats were pressured to move out from Serbia during the Yugoslav wars.

Under the rule of Serbian president Slobodan Milošević, a series of protests against Vojvodina's party leadership took place during the summer and autumn of 1988, which forced it to resign. Eventually Vojvodina and Kosovo had to accept Serbia's constitutional amendments that practically dismissed the autonomy of the provinces in Serbia. Vojvodina and Kosovo lost elements of statehood in September 1990 when the new constitution of the Republic of Serbia was adopted.

Vojvodina was still referred to as an autonomous province of Serbia, but most of its autonomous powers – including, crucially, its vote on the Yugoslav collective presidency – were transferred to the control of Belgrade, the capital. The province still had its own parliament and government, and some other autonomous functions as well. According to Đorđe Tomić, this is an example of a phantom border.

Contemporary period

The fall of Milošević in 2000 created a new political climate in Vojvodina. Following talks between the political parties, the level of the province's autonomy was somewhat increased by the omnibus law in 2002. The Vojvodina provincial assembly adopted a new statute on 15 October 2008, which, after being partially amended, was approved by the Parliament of Serbia.

On January 28, 2013, as an answer to the proposal of the Third Serbia political organization from Novi Sad to abolish the autonomy of Vojvodina, the pro-autonomist Vojvodina's Party performed a campaign that involved the posting of "Republic of Vojvodina" posters in Novi Sad.

Geography

Vojvodina is situated in the northern quarter of Serbia, in the southeast part of the Pannonian Plain, the plain that remained when the Pliocene Pannonian Sea dried out. As a consequence of this, Vojvodina is rich in fertile loamy loess soil, covered with a layer of chernozem. The region is divided by the Danube and Tisa rivers into: Bačka in the northwest, Banat in the east and Syrmia (Srem) in the southwest. A small part of the Mačva region is also located in Vojvodina, in the Srem District.

Today, the western part of Syrmia is in Croatia, the northern part of Bačka is in Hungary, the eastern part of Banat is in Romania (with a small piece in Hungary), while Baranja (which is between the Danube and the Drava) is in Hungary and Croatia. Vojvodina is also part of the Danube-Kris-Mures-Tisa euroregion. The Gudurica peak (Gudurički vrh) on the Vršac Mountains, is the highest peak in Vojvodina, at an altitude of 641 m above sea level.

The climate of the area is moderate continental, including cold winters and hot and humid summers. The Vojvodina climate is characterized by a vast range of extreme temperatures and very irregular rainfall distribution per month.

Politics

The Assembly of Vojvodina is the provincial legislature composed of 120 proportionally elected members. The current members were elected in the 2020 provincial elections. The Government of Vojvodina is the executive administrative body composed of a president and cabinet ministers.

The current ruling coalition in the Vojvodina parliament is composed of the following political parties: Serbian Progressive Party, Socialist Party of Serbia and Alliance of Vojvodina Hungarians. The current president of Vojvodinian government is Igor Mirović (Serbian Progressive Party), while the president of the provincial Assembly is István Pásztor (Alliance of Vojvodina Hungarians).

Vojvodina is divided into seven districts. They are regional centers of state authority, but have no powers of their own; they present purely administrative divisions. The seven districts are further subdivided into 37 municipalities and the 8 cities of Kikinda, Novi Sad, Subotica, Zrenjanin, Pančevo, Sombor, Sremska Mitrovica, and Vršac.

Demographics

Vojvodina is more diverse than the rest of Serbia with more than 25 ethnic groups and six languages which are in official use by the provincial administration.

Population by ethnicity:

Population by mother tongue:

Population by religion:

Largest cities

Culture

There are two daily newspapers published in Vojvodina, Dnevnik in Serbian and Magyar Szó in Hungarian. Monthly and weekly publications in minority languages include Hrvatska riječ ("Croatian Word") in Croatian, Hlas Ľudu ("The Voice of the People") in Slovak, Libertatea ("Freedom") in Romanian, and Руске слово ("Rusyn Word") in Rusyn. There is also Bunjevačke novine ("The Bunjevac newspaper") in Bunjevac.

Public Broadcasting Service of Vojvodina was founded in 1974 as Radio Television of Novi Sad, as an equal member of the association of JRT – Yugoslav Radio Television. Radio Novi Sad's first broadcast was on November 29, 1949. During the NATO bombing in the spring of 1999, the RT Novi Sad building of 20 thousand square meters was completely destroyed along with its basic production and technical premises . The Venac terrestrial broadcasting site was heavily damaged.

The Radio-Television of Vojvodina produces and broadcasts regional programming on two channels, RTV1 (Serbian language) and RTV2 (minority languages), and three radio frequencies: Radio Novi Sad 1 (Serbian), Radio Novi Sad 2 (Hungarian), Radio Novi Sad 3 (other minority communities).

Economy

The economy of Vojvodina is largely based on developed food industry and fertile agricultural soil. Agriculture is a priority sector in Vojvodina. Traditionally, it has always been a significant part of the local economy and a generator of positive results, due to the abundance of fertile agricultural land which makes up 84% of its territory. The share of agribusiness in the total industrial production is 40%, that is 30% in the total exports of Vojvodina.

The metal industry of Vojvodina has a long tradition and consists of smaller metal processing companies for components manufacturing and, to a lesser extent, of original equipment manufacturers (OEM) with their own brand name products. Vojvodina Metal Cluster gathers 116 companies with 6,300 employees. Other branches of industry are also developed such as the chemical industry, electrical industry, oil industry and construction industry. In the past decade, ICT sector has been growing rapidly and has taken significant role in Vojvodina's economic development.

High- tech sector is a fast-growing sector in Vojvodina. Software development represents the main source of revenue, particularly development of ERP solutions, Java applications and mobile applications. IT sector companies mainly deal with software outsourcing, based on demands of international clients or with development of their own software products for purposes of domestic and international market.
Vojvodina pays particular attention to interregional and cross-border economic cooperation, as well as to implementation of priorities defined within the EU Strategy for the Danube Region.

Some of the companies from Vojvodina:
Naftna Industrija Srbije
Srbijagas
HIP Petrohemija
Apatin Brewery
Novosadski sajam

Vojvodina promotes its investment potentials through the Vojvodina Investment Promotion (VIP) agency, which was founded by the Parliament of the Autonomous Province of Vojvodina.

Transport
There are many important roads which pass through Vojvodina. First of all, the motorway A1 motorway which goes from Central Europe and the Horgos border crossing to Hungary, via Novi Sad to Belgrade and further to the southeast toward Niš, where it branches: one way leads east to the border with Bulgaria; the other to the south, towards Greece. Motorway A3 in Srem separates the west, towards the neighboring Croatia and further to Western Europe. There is also a network of regional and local roads and railway lines.

The three largest rivers in Vojvodina are navigable stream. Danube River with a length of 588 kilometers and its tributaries Tisa (168 km), Sava (206 km) and Bega (75 km).

Tourism

Tourist destinations in Vojvodina include well known Orthodox monasteries on Fruška Gora mountain, numerous hunting grounds, cultural-historical monuments, different folklores, interesting galleries and museums, plain landscapes with a lot of greenery, big rivers, canals and lakes, sandy terrain Deliblatska Peščara ("the European Sahara"), etc.
In the last few years, Exit has been very popular among the European summer music festivals.

See also
Vojvodina Autonomist Movement
Rinflajš

References

External links

 Government of the Autonomous Province of Vojvodina
 Assembly of the Autonomous Province of Vojvodina
 Provincial Secretariat for Regional and International Cooperation
 Tourism organization of Vojvodina
Useful information about Vojvodina, Parks of Nature, River Expedition, Wine Trails, Cities, Etno, Adventure and more
Interactive map of Novi Sad
Atlas of Vojvodina (Wikimedia Commons)
Statistical information about municipalities of Vojvodina
List of largest cities of Vojvodina
 The encyclopedia of Vojvodina
Official symbols of AP Vojvodina 

 
Autonomous provinces of Serbia
Statistical regions of Serbia
States and territories established in 1944
Historical regions in Serbia
Autonomous regions
Serbian-speaking countries and territories
Romanian-speaking countries and territories
Hungarian-speaking countries and territories
Croatian-speaking countries and territories
Regions of Europe with multiple official languages
1944 establishments in Yugoslavia
Rusyn communities